Ladislav Adamec (10 September 1926 – 14 April 2007) was a Czechoslovak communist politician.

Early life
Adamec was born in Moravia on 10 September 1926.

Career
Adamec joined the Presidium in March 1987 and served as the prime minister of the Czech Socialist Republic from March 1987 to 1988. Upon the retirement of Prime Minister Lubomír Štrougal on 12 October 1988, he assumed the role, thus serving as the last Communist prime minister of Czechoslovakia. He served in the post from 12 October 1988 to 7 December 1989. Marián Čalfa succeeded Adamec as prime minister.

On 20 December, Adamec became general secretary of the Communist Party of Czechoslovakia. However, he was not the de facto leader of the country; the party had given up its monopoly of power on 29 November.

In March 1990, Adamec became the chairman of the Communist Party. The post was created with his appointment.

Velvet Revolution
The Velvet Revolution lasted from 17 November to 29 December 1989. During the Velvet Revolution student protesters took to the streets of Prague in what became an overthrow of the government. Large demonstrations that occurred on 25 and 26 November, and a public strike on 27 November, pushed the communist regime into holding a conference with the Civic Forum. The Forum demanded that Adamec form a new government—that would include existing political parties and Civic Forum. The federal government under Adamec had been in contact with different leaders since 21 November and on 26 November, Adamec even addressed the crowds on Letná.

Death
Adamec died on 14 April 2007, at the age of 80.

References

1926 births
2007 deaths
People from Frenštát pod Radhoštěm
Leaders of the Communist Party of Czechoslovakia
Communist Party of Czechoslovakia prime ministers
Prime Ministers of Czechoslovakia
Government ministers of Czechoslovakia
Members of the Chamber of the Nations of Czechoslovakia (1990–1992)
Czech communists
Prime Ministers of the Czech Socialist Republic
People of the Velvet Revolution